Masego Kgomo (c. 1999 – 31 December 2009) was a South African girl murdered in order to provide body parts for rituals performed by a sangoma. Her murder sparked calls for sangomas to stop using human flesh for rituals.

Kgomo went missing near her home in Soshanguve, a township north of Pretoria, on 31 December 2009. Five people were initially charged with her kidnapping and murder. A suspect led police to Kgomo's body in Soshanguve in the early hours of 9 January 2010.

On 28 November 2011, Judge Billy Mothle found 30-year-old Brian Mangwale guilty of her murder and kidnapping in the Pretoria High Court. Mangwale was sentenced to life imprisonment for her murder and six years imprisonment for her kidnapping.

See also
List of kidnappings
Muti killings

References

2009 murders in South Africa
December 2009 events in South Africa
Crimes involving Satanism or the occult
Formerly missing people
Incidents of violence against girls
Kidnappings in South Africa
Missing person cases in Africa
Traditional African medicine